Richard F. Snow (born 1947) is an American historian and writer of novels and short stories.

Biography

Snow is the author of the 1981 novel, The Burning, a fictionalized account of the Hinckley, Minnesota, fire of 1894. His other works include The Funny Road (1975) and The Iron Road (1979), which was a Boston Globe–Horn Book Award Honor book in 1979.

Snow graduated from Columbia University in 1970 and began working at American Heritage Magazine. Succeeding Byron Dobell, he served as the editor from 1990 to 2007.

After the magazine closed, he returned to writing full-time, penning A Measureless Peril: America in the Fight for the Atlantic, the Longest Battle of World War II, about America’s role in the Battle of the Atlantic during World War II (Scribner, 2011) and I Invented the Modern Age: The Rise of Henry Ford, a biography of Henry Ford (2014). In 2016, he published Iron Dawn: The Monitor, the Merrimack, and the Civil War Sea Battle that Changed History which won that years Samuel Eliot Morison Award for Naval Literature. In 2019 he published the story of Walt Disney's invention of the amusement park, Disney's Land.

References

Living people
1947 births
Columbia College (New York) alumni
20th-century American novelists
American male novelists
American male short story writers
20th-century American short story writers
20th-century American male writers